Oliver Wendel Dobbins (born November 30, 1941) is a former American football defensive back who played one season with the Buffalo Bills of the National Football League (NFL). He was drafted by the Pittsburgh Steelers in the eighteenth round of the 1964 NFL Draft. Dobbins played college football at Morgan State University and attended West Philadelphia High School in Philadelphia, Pennsylvania. He was a member of the Buffalo Bills teams that won the 1964 AFL championships.

References

External links
 Just Sports Stats
 

Living people
1941 births
American football defensive backs
Buffalo Bills players
Morgan State Bears football players
Players of American football from Philadelphia
African-American players of American football
American Football League players
21st-century African-American people
20th-century African-American sportspeople